"He Is" is a song recorded by American singer Brandy for her third studio album Full Moon (2002). It was written by Warryn Campbell, Harold Lilly and Norwood, with production handled by Campbell and Norwood. Conceived during spiritual discussions with Norwood, Campbell and Lilly conceptualized the pop and R&B-influenced ballad secretly as a gospel song, as they were keen to hear her sing a religious track, a genre which Norwood declined to record at the time. Lyrically speaking about God in third person, Norwood was unaware "He Is" was not a relationship-themed song when she recorded it.

"He Is" was released as the third and final single from Full Moon on July 29, 2002, by Atlantic Records. It received mostly positive reviews from music critics, many of whom applauded Norwood's vocal performance and the sparse production, but dismissed the song as a weak single choice. Likewise, the track failed to reprise the success of the album's previous singles "What About Us?" and "Full Moon"; while it failed to chart on the Billboard Hot 100 in the United States, it reached number 78 on the Hot R&B/Hip-Hop Songs.

Writing and recording
Producer Warryn Campbell met then-15-year-old Norwood when he started playing keyboards in her live band. Though he left the band two years later to pursue a career in music production, the pair reunited in 2001 along with songwriter Harold Lilly to collaborate on Norwood's third studio album Full Moon. During the first month they worked together, Campbell, Lilly, and Norwood discussed spirituality. Norwood, who was raised in a Christian household, read a lot of religious and spiritual texts as that time, but while conversations prompted Campbell to ask Norwood to record a gospel song, Norwood declined.

Determined to get Norwood to sing a gospel song, Campbell convinced Lilly to craft a song which would speak discreetly about God in third person. Though Norwood later joined the couple for additional writing on the track, Campbell and Lilly kept the initial meaning of the song a secret until its single release. In an interview with Yahoo! Music in August 2002, Campbell revealed: "I've never told [Norwood]. She still don't know. She thinks it's about birth. And I wanted her to sing it like it's about birth. That gave it that push. She has probably figured it out by now."

The recording of additional ad-libs for the radio remixes was tracked by the MTV reality series Brandy: Special Delivery (2002). Norwood also worked with Guy Roche, producer of her 1998 song "Almost Doesn't Count", on an acoustic guitar-led pop version with entirely new vocals. Underwhelmed with the outcome, Norwood initially questioned whether to release "He Is" as the single at all, since she felt it was not modifiable into a crossover hit. Calling the product of the recording session "real shit", Norwood left Roche's version unused.

Release
"He Is" was released as the third single from Full Moon by Atlantic Records. It was serviced to rhythmic contemporary radio in the United States on September 17, 2002. While it received no international release, its US release was accompanied by a promotional CD single, which included two slightly shorter radio remixes produced by Campbell.

Critical reception
In his review for Billboard, editor Chuck Taylor wrote that "the slow jam offers a sensual groove, with the sparse production leaving ample room for a vocal spotlight". He felt that the track prioritized style over melody, and "the simple chorus – using only three notes – does not include much of a hook. The cut certainly makes for good music, fitting for quiet-storm shows, but as a single, it would have a hard time standing out on radio." His Billboard colleague Michael Paoletta called "He Is" one "of the most shining moments" on Full Moon. Jet magazine found that the "sensuous sound" of "He Is" was evidence of Norwood's musical growth with the album. Similarly, Vibe found that the song was a vessel for a "a wide range of emotions" on Full Moon, with "a more matured voice shining" on "He Is". AllMusic's Stephen Thomas Erlewine ranked the song among his three favorites from Full Moon, along with the title track and "What About Us?".

Track listing
Promotional CD single
"He Is" (album version) – 4:21
"He Is" (Radio Remix 1) – 4:09
"He Is" (Radio Remix 2) – 4:09

Credits and personnel
Credits are adapted from the liner notes of Full Moon.

 Sandra Campbell – project coordination
 Warryn Campbell – instrumentation, production, vocal arrangement, vocal production, writing
 Reggie Dozier – engineering
 Jan Fairchild – engineering
 Thor Laewe – engineering

 Harold Lilly – writing
 Manny Marroquin – mixing
 Brandy Norwood – vocals, production, vocal arrangement, vocal production, writing
 Rebeka Tuinei – mixing assistance
 Benjamin F. Wright, Jr. – string arrangement

Charts

Release history

References

External links
 

Brandy Norwood songs
2002 singles
Song recordings produced by Warryn Campbell
Songs written by Warryn Campbell
Pop ballads
Songs written by Harold Lilly (songwriter)
Gospel songs
Contemporary R&B ballads
2000s ballads
Songs written by Brandy Norwood